Ratowice  is a village in the administrative district of Gmina Czernica, within Wrocław County, Lower Silesian Voivodeship, in south-western Poland.

The village has a population of 1,100.

References

Ratowice